Slimane Raho (born 20 October 1975 in Oran) is an Algerian former professional football who played as a right-back. An international from 1998 to 2010, Raho represented the Algeria national team from 1998 to 2010, participating in the 2002, 2004 and 2010 Africa Cup of Nations. In total, he had 48 caps for the team, including 18 FIFA World Cup qualifying matches. He made his debut for the national team against Libya on 14 August 1998.

International statistics

Honours

Club
CAF competitions
Won the CAF Cup three times with JS Kabylie in 2000, 2001 and 2002

UAFA competitions
Won the Arab Cup Winners' Cup twice with MC Oran in 1997 and 1998
Won the Arab Super Cup once with MC Oran in 1999
Won the Arab Champions League twice with ES Setif in 2007 and 2008

UNAF competitions
Won the North African Cup of Champions once with ES Sétif in 2009
Won the North African Cup Winners Cup once with ES Sétif in 2010
Won the North African Super Cup once with ES Sétif in 2010

Algerian competitions
Won the Algerian League four times:
Twice with JS Kabylie in 2004 and 2006
Twice with ES Setif in 2007 and 2009
Runner-up of the Algerian League five times:
Twice with MC Oran in 1996 and 1997
Twice with JS Kabylie in 2002 and 2005
Won the Algerian Cup two times:
Once with MC Oran in 1996
Once with ES Sétif in 2010
Finalist of the Algerian Cup two times:
Once with MC Oran in 1998
Once with JS Kabylie in 2004
Won the Algerian League Cup once with MC Oran in 1996

Country
Participated in the 2002 African Cup of Nations in Mali (2 games)
Participated in the 2004 African Cup of Nations in Tunisia (0 games)
Participated in the 2010 African Cup of Nations in Angola (2 games)
Has 48 caps for the Algerian National Team

References

External links

1975 births
Association football fullbacks
2002 African Cup of Nations players
2004 African Cup of Nations players
2010 Africa Cup of Nations players
Algerian footballers
Algeria international footballers
Algerian expatriate sportspeople in France
Algerian expatriate footballers
Algerian Ligue Professionnelle 1 players
ASM Oran players
ES Sétif players
Expatriate footballers in France
JS Kabylie players
Living people
MC Oran players
Olympique Noisy-le-Sec players
Footballers from Oran
Competitors at the 1997 Mediterranean Games
Algeria under-23 international footballers
Algeria youth international footballers
Mediterranean Games competitors for Algeria
21st-century Algerian people